Carl John Walter Kaskel (February 2, 1882, Berlin - October 9, 1928, Berlin) was a German jurist. He studied legal science in Berlin, Munich and Freiburg im Breisgau.

Literary works 
 editor of the "Neue Zeitschrift für Arbeitsrecht", 1921-
 editor of the "Monatsschrift für Arbeiter-und Angestelltenversicherung", 1913-
 Grundriss des sozialen Rechts, 1912 (with Friedrich Sitzler)
 Die rechtliche Natur des Arbeiterschutzes, 1914
 Das neue Arbeitsrecht, 1920

Literature 
 Jürgen Nürnberger: Walter Kaskel : Leben und Werk 1882-1928. Ludwigshafen : JNV, 2008. [In progress].

External links 
 Kaskel, Carl John Walter - Berlin Lexikon at www.luise-berlin.de
 Chronik: Berlin am 2. Februar, Fakten Jahr für Jahr at www.luise-berlin.de
 Kaskel - new and used books at www.isbn.pl

1882 births
1928 deaths
Jurists from Berlin